Khartoum Variations is the first of six releases in 2006 by singer-songwriter Jandek. Released by Corwood Industries, it is his 44th album overall.  The recordings are alternate versions of seven of the eight songs from his previous album, Khartoum.

There has been some speculation on the Jandek discussion group that Khartoum Variations may be the result of an earlier attempt to record the same songs. Since Jandek releases feature limited information other than song titles, copyright dates and Corwood's mailing address, this cannot be confirmed.

In the album's artwork, the artist stands in front of Dublin Castle, as identified by a member of the Jandek discussion list.  The photo appears to have been heavily altered, seemingly removing part of the building from the picture, as evidenced by pictures taken from the same angle by the same member.

Track listing

See also
 Corwood Industries discography

References

External links 
  Corwood Industries homepage

2006 albums
Jandek albums
Corwood Industries albums